Gordon Morgan (born 31 August 1959) is an English cricketer.  Morgan is a right-handed batsman who bowls right-arm medium pace.  He was born in Kampala, Uganda, which was then under British rule.

Gordon attended Denstone College boarding school in Denstone, Uttoxeter, Staffordshire, England from 1973 until 1978. He played first team cricket from the age of 14 and first team rugby from the age of 16. He was school prefect and house captain in his final year.

Morgan made his debut in county cricket for Bedfordshire in the 1979 Minor Counties Championship against Hertfordshire.  He made 6 further appearances for Bedfordshire in that season, with his last appearance coming against Shropshire.  In 1980 he moved to Australia for 18 months where he played second grade for the Northern Districts Cricket Club in Sydney. 

On return from Australia, he played for Surrey County Cricket Club second team for 2 years, before moving to Suffolk.

In 1983, he joined Suffolk, making his debut for the county in the MCCA Knockout Trophy against Cambridgeshire.  Morgan played Minor counties cricket for Suffolk from 1983 to 1988, which included 27 Minor Counties Championship appearances and 7 MCCA Knockout Trophy matches.  He made his List A debut against Worcestershire in the 1984 NatWest Trophy.  He made 4 further List A appearances for Suffolk, the last of which came against Leicestershire in the 1988 NatWest Trophy.  In his 5 List A matches, he scored 51 runs at an average of 10.20, with a high score of 40.

Morgan has toured seven times with the MCC, playing senior cricket for Berkshire over 50s and most recently playing for England over 50s in Sri Lanka in 2017.
He has scored 117 100s in his career. 
He is the current chairman of Wraysbury cricket club in Berkshire. 

His brother, Michael, played List A and Minor counties cricket for Bedfordshire.

Gordon has four children, Holly, Matthew, Annabel and Jacob. Holly Morgan, his eldest, is currently working as a Cardiologist in London. He is well known in the Wraysbury Village Club for his eponymous drink.

References

External links
Gordon Morgan at ESPNcricinfo
Gordon Morgan at CricketArchive

1959 births
Living people
Cricketers from Kampala
English cricketers
English people of Scottish descent
Bedfordshire cricketers
Suffolk cricketers
Ugandan emigrants to the United Kingdom